Lithoxus jantjae is a species of armored catfish endemic to Venezuela where it  occurs in the Ventuari River above the Tencua Falls.  This species grows to a length of  SL.

References
 

Ancistrini
Fish of Venezuela
Endemic fauna of Venezuela
Fish described in 2008